Me. I Am Mariah... The Elusive Chanteuse is the fourteenth studio album by American singer-songwriter Mariah Carey, released on May 23, 2014, on Def Jam Recordings. The record had been in development since 2011; during its production, Carey hired collaborator Randy Jackson to manage her career, before firing and replacing him with another frequent collaborator, Jermaine Dupri. The album consists of guest appearances from Nas, Miguel, Wale, and Fabolous, in addition to Carey's twins Moroccan and Monroe. On the deluxe edition of the album, R. Kelly and Mary J. Blige respectively make appearances on remixes of two songs, "Betcha Gon’ Know" and "It's a Wrap", taken from Carey's twelfth studio album Memoirs of an Imperfect Angel (2009). These remixes were originally intended to appear on Carey's cancelled remix album, Angel's Advocate (2010).

The album was initially titled The Art of Letting Go, and was scheduled for release in 2012, however, following the commercial failure of the single, "Triumphant (Get 'Em)", featuring Rick Ross and Meek Mill, additional songs were recorded for the album causing the release date to be pushed back several times by the record company throughout 2013 and again in 2014. Together with Bryan Michael Cox, Carey and Dupri were executive producers on the album. It is named after a self-portrait that Carey drew as a very young girl that she captioned "Me. I Am Mariah". The portion of the album called "The Elusive Chanteuse" is a nickname Carey gave herself for the album.

Me. I Am Mariah... The Elusive Chanteuse was promoted through several media appearances by Carey, as well as The Elusive Chanteuse Show. Singles released from the album included the US Hot 100 top twenty song "#Beautiful" (a duet with Miguel). Other singles included "The Art of Letting Go", "You're Mine (Eternal)", and "You Don't Know What to Do" (featuring rapper Wale), all of which failed to chart on the US Hot 100, with the exception of "You're Mine (Eternal)", a minor hit peaking at number eighty-eight. Although the re-release of her 2002 album Charmbracelet was issued with a Parental Advisory warning in some territories, Me. I Am Mariah... is Carey's first studio album to bear the warning in the United States.

Background 
On September 29, 2009, Carey's twelfth studio album, Memoirs of an Imperfect Angel, was released. Following the cancellation of Angels Advocate, a remix album of Memoirs of an Imperfect Angel, it was announced that Carey would return to the studio to start work on her thirteenth studio album. It was later revealed that it would be her second Christmas album. The album, titled Merry Christmas II You, was released alongside an accompanying DVD, and was sent to retailers on November 2, 2010. Merry Christmas II You debuted at number four on the Billboard 200 with sales of 56,000 copies. It also became Carey's 16th top ten album in the United States. The album debuted at number one on the R&B/Hip-Hop Albums chart, making it only the second Christmas album to top this chart. Following the birth of her children, Carey began work on her fourteenth studio album.

Development 
The first indication that Carey had begun work on her fourteenth studio album was in February 2011, with Carey stating: "I start writing for my new album this week-but it's just the beginning...." In March 2011, Carey's representative said she will donate royalties for the song "Save the Day", which she had written for her upcoming studio album, to charities that create awareness for human-rights issues. Her husband Nick Cannon told Billboard in May 2011 that Carey had already completed a good amount of recording for a new album, a few months before during her pregnancy: "She's planning on having a [new single] out this year. She's been working away, and we have a studio in the crib, and [the pregnancy] has totally inspired her on so many different levels." Additionally, Cannon confirmed that Carey was inspired by her debut self-titled album and its follow-up, Emotions.

In January 2012, Cannon updated everyone on the album, saying: "My beautiful wife is planning to make her return to the music scene after taking time off to focus on the pregnancy and the birth of our two wonderful babies, Moroccan and Monroe." On August 3, 2012, Carey released "Triumphant (Get 'Em)", a collaboration with rappers Rick Ross and Meek Mill, which was originally claimed to be the lead single for her upcoming studio album. The single garnered low impact both critically and commercially, and was eventually removed from the album. The Island Def Jam Music Group was shuttered by Universal Music Group on April 1, 2014. Island Records and Def Jam Recordings operate as separate entities, with Carey being transferred from Island to Def Jam.

Recording 
In September 2011, producer and friend Jermaine Dupri took to his social network Global14 to reveal that he's back in the studio with Carey working on new music. In August 2012, Bryan Michael Cox said about the album: "She was committed to making it before she got pregnant. Then she got pregnant and she took the time off. Then after she came back, we started really vibing again and we picked up right where we left off. I just feel like between [record producer] Jermaine Dupri, myself and her, we came up with a few things that [are] really, really a solid body of work". In September 2012, Carey was in the studio with R. Kelly.

Carey said about her fourteenth studio album: "I'm collaborating with a lot of my favorite people but the main thing is [that] I'm not trying to follow any particular trend, I want it to be well received. I want to stay true to myself and the music that I love and make the fans happy". Some of the people that Carey worked with on the album include: DJ Clue?, Randy Jackson, Q-Tip, R. Kelly, David Morales, Loris Holland, Stevie J, James Fauntleroy, Ray Angry, Jermaine Dupri, Bryan-Michael Cox, James "Big Jim" Wright, Hit-Boy, The-Dream, Da Brat, and Rodney Jerkins.

Carey gave Billboard an exclusive interview in their March 9, 2013, issue, stating: "It's about making sure I have tons of good music, because at the end of the day, that's the most important thing.... There are a lot more raw ballads than people might expect... there are also uptempo and signature-type songs that represent [my] different facets as an artist.... Wherever we go with this project, I've tried to keep the soul and heart in it." Billboard also asked Carey about the title of the album, but she declined to reveal it. In late March 2013, Carey stated that she "has more than enough songs" but "she's in the process of finishing things and mixing and all that".
In mid-2013, she was seen in the studio on separate occasions with Mike Will Made It and Young Jeezy, Wale, and Nas. In October 2013, Jermaine Dupri was announced as Carey's new manager.

In an interview in February 2014, Carey added that there are songs on the album that are about her husband Nick Cannon as well as songs that she wrote specifically for her twins Moroccan and Monroe. That same month, Carey announced to MTV News that she has added three new songs to the track list, 1 extra Hitboy record and two new remixes and stated that she is in the process of choosing a new title for the album. The two remixes are of the songs "Betcha Gon' Know" and "It's a Wrap", previously featured on 2009's Memoirs of an Imperfect Angel; R. Kelly features on the former, while Mary J. Blige features on the latter. The cover versions were confirmed to be George Michael's 1988 single, "One More Try", and cover of a Mary Mary song, "Can't Give Up Now", with a slightly different arrangement and additional writing credit by Carey. There is also a cover of the patriotic song "America the Beautiful" for the Japanese CD edition of the album.

Music and lyrics 

Consisting of fifteen songs and four deluxe songs Me. I Am Mariah... The Elusive Chanteuse is an R&B album with a diverse musical style that incorporates hip hop, hip hop soul, soul and elements of disco and gospel.
Mike Wass of Idolator described the album as being a concept album that journeys through the eras of R&B, from Motown to the '90s, disco and early hip-hop.

Writing for The Boston Globe, Sarah Rodman said "Me. I Am Mariah... offers up rhythmic hip-hop pop, gospel-inflected power ballads, old-school soul, and straight-up disco fantasias"; Rodman described the album's production as being built over a "pulsating atmosphere" and "fidgety rhythmic tracks."
Jim Farber of New York Daily News cited the album as a return from her previous studio album Memoirs of an Imperfect Angel (2009), which Fader described as a "disastrous", Farber noted the album's musical content as containing "grand balladry, and formal melodies."

Melissa Maerz of Entertainment Weekly, noted "nostalgia" to be a big and recurring theme both lyrically and musically, continuing to comment on this saying the "arrangements that borrow from Inner Life's disco rave-up 'I'm Caught Up (In a One Night Love Affair)' and the O'Jays' Philly-soul classic 'Let Me Make Love to You'."
Eric Henderson of Slant Magazine noted the album's lyrics to be "personal, crazy. Crazy personal," Henderson continued calling the album's lyrical content an "deliberately confusing innocence with insight, obliviousness with bliss."
Carey's voice on the album was described by Elysa Gardner of USA Today, as "artful melisma, robust belting and decorative high notes." Gardner continued, noting Mariah's use of her "supple middle and lower registers to convey feeling simply and directly."

Composition 

The album opens with "Cry", a gospel song built over a piano, "simmering vocals and full-bodied runs" containing "swirling organs and scaling ad-lib." Described by Billboard magazine as being one of the album's most "heaviest moments," lyrically the song discusses Carey's desire to hold a lover until they both start "bawling." "Faded" is a "luscious" R&B song produced by Mike Will Made It, the song and Carey's vocals feature "climaxes" with the song taking influence from R&B hip-hop and pop genres. "Dedicated" features American rapper Nas, the song contains a sample from "Da Mystery of Chessboxin'" as performed by Wu-Tang Clan and lyrically discusses nostalgia, with Mariah and Nas looking back at their past relationships and how they have shaped their lives.

"#Beautiful" is a mid-tempo and stripped down R&B and soul music song. Carey's "big vocals" combined with Miguel's "signature eclectic rock and roll sound" results in "#Beautiful" having an old school vibe to it reminiscent of the Stax Records/Motown Records era, according to a reviewer for The Honesty Hour. "Thirsty" is a "club-friendly" hip hop and R&B song, which lasts for a duration of three minutes and 26 seconds. "Thirsty" is about how Carey's lover has a thirst for fame which causes her to drown in her own misery. American rapper Rich Homie Quan performs background chants on "Thirsty", although he is not credited on the album track list. He does, however, appear as a featured artist on a shortened alternate version of the song, and performs one rap verse.

"Make It Look Good" features Stevie Wonder on harmonica, and lyrically talks about "getting played" by a man yet she is deciding "to just go with it," the song is built over a "skipping '80's" beat that contains interpolations of "Let Me Make Love to You", written by Walter "Bunny" Sigler and Allan Felder.
"You're Mine (Eternal)" is a love song which lasts for a duration of three minutes and forty-two seconds. The song utilizes an hypnotic and "smooth, steady" beat, which slowly but gradually builds to a sudden climax at the end. Lyrically, the track features Carey reminiscing about a past lover.

"You Don't Know What to Do" features American rapper Wale and contains interpolations of "I'm Caught Up in a One Night Love Affair", written by Patrick Adams and Terri Gonzalez. The song is a disco inspired track containing a "bumping" beat compared to music of 1977. "Supernatural" is a "sappy cut" featuring Carey's children credited as "Dem Babies". "Meteorite" is built over a "disco beat", lyrically the song is a running "commentary on celebrity culture", and contains a sample from "Goin' Up in Smoke", performed by Eddie Kendricks. "Camouflage" is a piano ballad, followed by "Money" featuring rapper Fabulous and features a sample from "Alabeke", performed by Dan Snatch, and "Rapper Dapper Snapper" performed by Edwin Birdsong. "Money" is an R&B song built over a "thumping" beat produced by Hit-Boy with lyrics that revolve around money not being important.

"One More Try" is a cover of George Michael's 1988 single of the same name, with an "'80s taste" and a "schmaltzy" production. "Heavenly (No Ways Tired / Can't Give Up Now)" is a gospel song with a choir that is dedicated as a tribute to the late Reverend James Cleveland. It contains an excerpt from the Reverend's sermon "God's Promise" performed by James Cleveland. The song also contains a sample of "Can't Give Up Now" performed by Mary Mary, "I Don't Feel No Ways Tired" performed by James Cleveland and "Good Ole Music" performed by Funkadelic.

The deluxe album consists of four extra songs; the opening track "It's A Wrap" features American singer Mary J. Blige. The song contains a sample of "I Belong to You" by Barry White, performed by the Love Unlimited Orchestra. "Betcha Gon' Know" was originally recorded and included on Carey's 2009 album Memoirs of an Imperfect Angel, the remix featuring R. Kelly leaked in July 2011, and draws influence from R&B. Carey announced that the remix would appear the album as a deluxe edition bonus track. "The Art of Letting Go" is an empowering gospel and classic R&B ballad with use of the piano, strings, and guitar. The song was originally the inspiration to also call the album The Art of Letting Go however, during an interview with MTV in February 2014, Carey revealed that she was frustrated that the album title leaked as she had not intended for the public to know about it just yet, and as a result she would be retitling the album.

Title and artwork 
On June 16, 2013, Walmart put the album up for pre-order and revealed its title as The Art of Letting Go. The following day, producer Jermaine Dupri confirmed that Walmart was correct and that the album would be called The Art of Letting Go. In February 2014, Carey expressed dismay that the album's title had leaked and confirmed that a new title would now be chosen. The album is now titled Me. I Am Mariah... The Elusive Chanteuse, a two-part title taking its name from two things personal to Carey. The first part is the caption from Carey's "first and only self-portrait", a drawing she drew as a child which is included as part of the album's back cover, while the second half is a nickname she's adopted recently. Summarizing the title and album's concept, Carey said "This album is a reflection of some of the peaks and valleys that made me who I am today. I've always known me. I am Mariah." Carl Williot from Idolator called the album title both "absurd" and "insane". He also lambasted Carey for including "annoying" punctuation in the track listing, including a hashtag (#) for the song "#Beautiful", a period (.) for the song "Cry." and appending characters to the song "Money ($ * / ...)". Times Dan Macsai called it the "greatest, most over-the-top album title of all time."

On the standard edition cover, Carey poses with her arms behind her head, while wearing a nude-colored crocheted swimsuit. The deluxe edition features a close-up of Carey's face, on the same sun-kissed background. Jeremy Blacklow from Yahoo! Music commented that some fans felt that the album covers "look retouched to the extreme".

Release 
In the April 2012 issue of Shape magazine, Carey stated: "I've started writing songs for a new album, which I hope will come out in 2012. Getting back in the studio and making music again-which I truly love doing-is the best way to end this crazy year". In August 2012, Carey's then-manager Randy Jackson told Billboard that the album was set for release in March 2013. Carey told Ryan Seacrest in September 2012: "I want[ed] [it] to [be released] sooner, but I guess it wouldn't be ready until around January 2013, somewhere around there. I wanted to put another single out, a ballad. I love it, but I'm still writing, I'm still working. So, you never know what it's going to end up being".

In February 2013, Carey stated that she wanted to release the album as soon as possible. The album was delayed to May 2013, which soon changed to July 23, 2013. However, the album was again delayed. On February 10, 2014, it was announced that the album was then set for release on May 6, 2014. Carey discussed issues around the failed singles and push backs during an interview with Billboard, for the magazine's cover story. She said that she wanted fans to hear the album as a full body of work and thus performance of individual singles was less important. Carey also considered a "Beyoncé-style surprise digital release" – Beyoncé released her self-titled album to the iTunes Store in December 2013 without any prior warning, but Def Jam confirmed that Carey's album would receive a traditional release with pre-orders starting May 1, 2014, and a pre-announced album cover, track listing and release date for May 27, 2014. The album also was released early to stream via USA iTunes 'First Play' on May 20, 2014.  The album served as Carey's final release under her deal with Def Jam.

Promotion 

Carey taped a performance of "#Beautiful" along with a medley of her greatest hits on May 15, 2013. The medley included Carey's debut "Vision of Love", as well as other songs such as "Make it Happen", "We Belong Together", "My All", and "Hero". The taping aired the following day (May 16) during the American Idol Season 12 finale episode. Carey performed "#Beautiful" with Miguel on June 2, 2013, at Hot 97's Summer Jam XX festival. She performed the remix of the song with Young Jeezy and Miguel on June 30, 2013, at the BET Awards.

The singer taped a performance of "The Art of Letting Go", along with a medley of "Auld Lang Syne", "Fantasy", "Honey", "#Beautiful", "Emotions", "Always Be My Baby", "Touch My Body" and "We Belong Together", for Dick Clark's New Year's Rockin' Eve, which aired on December 31, 2013. Carey performed "You're Mine (Eternal)" for the first time at the BET Honors on February 8, 2014, and the show premiered on TV Monday February 24, 2014. On February 13, 2014, Carey performed the song live while lighting up the Empire State Building. To promote the album further, Carey went on a two-legged headlining concert tour entitled, The Elusive Chanteuse Show.

Singles 
"#Beautiful" was released as the album's lead single on May 7, 2013. "#Beautiful" made its debut on the Billboard Hot 100 chart at number 24, the highest debut of the week. It has since peaked at 15, becoming Carey's 33rd Top 20 Hit, and being one of only 5 to miss the Top 10. It also gave Miguel his 3rd Top 20 hit, after "Power Trip" (2013) and "Adorn" (2012). According to Nielsen SoundScan, "#Beautiful" had sold 1.2 million copies in the United States as of April 2014. Internationally, the song reached the top-ten position in Australia, Croatia, Denmark, New Zealand, South Africa, and South Korea. The music video for "#Beautiful" was directed by Joseph Kahn. It was filmed on April 21 and 22, 2013. The video was supposed to have its world premiere on American Idol on May 8, 2013, however, the release date was pushed back to May 9, 2013, instead. It was made available to view on Vevo and YouTube immediately after its television debut.

"The Art of Letting Go" had its world premiere via Facebook on November 11, 2013. It was commercially unsuccessful, peaking at number 19 on the Billboard Bubbling Under Hot 100 Singles. "Thirsty" was released as second promotional single in May 2014.

"You're Mine (Eternal)" was released as the third single on February 12, 2014. Commercially, the song has had limited success, charting inside the top 40 in Hungary, Korea, and Spain. In the United States, the song peaked at number 88 on the Hot 100, but became Carey's 17th number-one single on the Hot Dance Club Songs chart, placing her in fifth position as the artist with most number-one songs on that chart. "You Don't Know What to Do" impacted urban contemporary radio on June 30, 2014, and rhythmic contemporary radio on July 1, 2014.

Critical reception 

Upon release, the album received generally positive reviews. The review aggregator website Metacritic gives a weighted average rating to an album based upon the selected independent mainstream reviews it utilizes, and the album has a Metascore of a 67 out of 100 based on 15 reviews. At AllMusic, Andy Kellman rated the album three-and-a-half stars out of five, saying how Mariah has abandoned the brevity of her earlier releases, but says the songstress is "still capable of delivering 40 minutes of strong, supremely voiced R&B when she's up for it.". He also stated that the standard edition of the album could have worked better without the clumpy and jumbled "Money", the oddly cheap sounding "One More Try", and the stiff/empty "Thirsty". Kenneth Partridge of Billboard rated the album a 77 out of 100, writing how Mariah has found her musical niche that her fans have come to expect that is a "mix of pop-classicist balladry and hip-hop-tinged summer jamming". At Entertainment Weekly, Melissa Maerz graded the album a B, saying how the release proves that her voice has been put through its paces, which she writes when Mariah is "trying to power through a note where it sounds like digital technology might be holding her up by the straps of that crocheted swimsuit." According to Gardner however, Mariah's vocal is "relaxed and confident". Also, Sargent notes that Mariah has "rarely sounded as comfortable."

Jim Farber of New York Daily News rated the album four stars out of five, writing how the title is not indicative of the release as a whole because he says Mariah is not "elusive" in the least on an album where she "made her talent more clear." At USA Today, Elysa Gardner rated the album three-and-a-half stars out of four, remarking whether "Elusive or not, this chanteuse is a survivor, and that's a rare thing in today's fickle, polarized pop landscape." Glenn Gamboa of Newsday graded the album an A−, commenting how Mariah has "nailed it" because she "goes for timeless [sounding music], with grand results." At The Plain Dealer, Troy L. Smith graded the album a B, indicating how the music meanders towards the latter stages of the album, yet noting that Mariah still picks the correct collaborators to work with on the release. According to Maher however, the collaborations serve no purpose just showing how Mariah is "desperate[ly] skirting around for identity" that "leaves this album feeling underwhelming." At Los Angeles Times, August Brown rated the album two-and-a-half stars out of four, indicating how Mariah vocally reined herself in on the album where she showcases her continued relevance. Kevin Ritchie of Now rated the album four N's out of five, finding out that "Carey's back to adding her sparkly touch to summer-ready pop tunes." At Pitchfork, Jordan Sargent rated the album a 7.7 out of ten, giving her credit for not sounding "desperate" because the tonality is "defiantly like Mariah, acknowledging her place in the pop ecosystem both implicitly and explicitly without chomping at the bit."

Nick Murray of Rolling Stone rated the album three stars out five, observing how "stylistic cohesion is as elusive as the chanteuse herself." At The Guardian, Caroline Sullivan rated the album three stars out of five, indicating how the release contains "a good deal of clutter", however, Mariah is "also at her most soulful and melodic" on a release she calls "a welcome return." Eric Henderson of Slant Magazine rated the album three stars out of five, observing how the release is chalked full of Undisciplined R&B pastiches." At The Boston Globe, Sarah Rodman gave a mixed review of the album, commenting on how even the good moments are "sabotaged", and the release as a whole is highly predictable with "a clutch of interchangeable slow-to-midtempo tunes long on pulsating atmosphere—several with distractingly fidgety rhythmic tracks—but short on melody or verve." Aimee Cliff of Fact rated the album two-and-a-half discs out of five, comparing the album unfavorably to Beyoncé's self-titled writing that "the record just doesn’t have the same candid, bold edge that characterised Beyonce's huge statement." At musicOMH, Amelia Maher rated the album two-and-a-half stars out of five, stating how Mariah's vocal range is undoubtedly robust, but this time around on the release she "falls short." On Rolling Stones 20 Best R&B Albums of 2014, Me. I Am Mariah... The Elusive Chanteuse ranked at number 18.

Year-end lists

Commercial performance 
In the United States, Me. I Am Mariah…The Elusive Chanteuse debuted at number three on the Billboard 200 albums chart with sales of 58,000 copies. It was her 17th top-ten album in the US since Nielsen SoundScan started tracking sales in 1991. It was present on the US Billboard 200 for a total of eight weeks, becoming her album with the shortest chart run to that point. As of April 2015, Me. I Am Mariah...The Elusive Chanteuse had sold 122,000 copies in the United States. Billboard speculated that its initial ratio of first-week sales to its sharp decline in sales thereafter suggested that interest in the album came primarily from a decreasing group of die-hard fans. 

Meanwhile, in the United Kingdom, the album peaked at number fourteen on the UK Albums Chart, with sales of 6,547 copies. In its second week, the album dropped forty places to number 54, before completely falling out of the top 100 in its third week.

Track listing

Notes 
  signifies an additional producer
  signifies co-producer
 "Supernatural" is subtitled "(with special guest stars "Dembabies" a.k.a. Ms. Monroe & Mr. Moroccan Scott Cannon a.k.a. Roc 'N Roe)" on physical editions of the album.
 "It's a Wrap" and "Betcha Gon' Know" are remixes of "It's a Wrap" and "Betcha Gon' Know (The Prologue)" from Memoirs of an Imperfect Angel respectively
 The standard CD edition of the album in Japan includes all tracks from the deluxe edition, in addition to the bonus track "America the Beautiful".
 The title track is only included on digital editions of the album; it is not included on physical editions, as it is Mariah reading what is printed beneath the disc tray of the jewel case.

Sample credits 
Sample credits taken from album notes.
 "Dedicated" contains a sample from "Da Mystery of Chessboxin'" by Wu-Tang Clan.
 "Make It Look Good" contains interpolations of "Let Me Make Love to You", written by Walter "Bunny" Sigler and Allan Felder
 "You Don't Know What to Do" contains interpolations of "I'm Caught Up in a One Night Love Affair", written by Patrick Adams and Terri Gonzalez
 "Meteorite" contains a sample from "Goin' Up in Smoke" by Eddie Kendricks
 "Money ($ * / ...)" features a sample from "Alabeke" by Dan Satch and "Rapper Dapper Snapper" by Edwin Birdsong
 "Heavenly (No Ways Tired/Can't Give Up Now)" is dedicated as a tribute to the late Reverend James Cleveland. It contains an excerpt from the Reverend's sermon "God's Promise" performed by James Cleveland. The song also contains a sample of "Can't Give Up Now" by Mary Mary, "I Don't Feel No Ways Tired" by James Cleveland and "Good Ole Music" by Funkadelic
 "It's a Wrap" contains a sample of "I Belong to You" by Barry White & The Love Unlimited Orchestra

Personnel 
Adapted from AllMusic.

 Mariah Carey –   executive producer, liner notes, primary artist, producer, vocal arrangement, vocals, background vocals
 Ray Angry – keyboards
 Cindi Berger – public relations
 Stacey Laverne Berry – choir/chorus
 Nakiba Bonds – choir/chorus
 Delbert Bowers – assistant
 Troy Bright – choir/chorus
 Kristofer Buckle – make-up
 Caroline Buckman – viola
 Darhyl "DJ" Camper – producer
 Mr. Moroccan a.k.a. Moroccan Scott Cannon – featured artist
 Dembabies a.k.a. Ms. Monroe – featured artist
 Louis Cato – bass
 Matt Champlin – engineer
 Lauren Chipman – viola
 Jeremy Cimino – assistant
 Giovanna Clayton – cello
 Bryan-Michael Cox –   producer, background vocals
 Brook Davis – additional production,   drum programming
 Joel Derouin – concert master, violin
 Jermaine Dupri –   management, mixing, producer, background vocals
 Jnyflower Choe – management
 Nico Essig – assistant
 Fabolous – featured artist,
 James Fauntleroy –   background vocals
 Allan Felder –
 Connie Filippelo – public relations
 Vanessa Freebairn-Smith – cello
 Chris Galland – assistant
 Brian Garten – engineer, mixing, vocal mixing
 Ayana George – choir/chorus
 Larry Gold – conductor, string arrangements
 Ajanee Hambrick – choir/chorus
 Chandler Harrod – assistant
 Tamara Hatwan – violin
 Haze Banga – additional production, engineer, mixing, vocals
 Hit-Boy – producer
 Melinda Michelle Holder-Dawkins – choir/chorus
 John Horesco – engineer
 Stephen Hybicki – engineer
 Jaycen Joshua – mixing
 Rodney "Darkchild" Jerkins –   producer
 Takeytha Johnson – background vocals
 Nasir "Nas" Jones –   featured artist
 R. Kelly – featured artist
 Julie Jung – cello
 Rob Katz – assistant
 Ryan Kaul – assistant
 Marisa Kuney – violin
 Latasha Jordan – choir/chorus
 Songa Lee – violin
 Mario de León – violin
 Melanie Lesley – choir/chorus
 Manny Marroquin – mixing
 Kevin Matela – assistant
 Sherry McGhee – choir/chorus, background vocals
 Erin McGlover – choir/chorus
 Serena McKinney – violin
 Louise McNally – management
 Rachel MacIntosh – Assistant to Mariah Carey
 Melanie Rochford – choir/chorus
 Angelina Mendez – choir/chorus
 Miguel Pimentel –   drum programming, featured artist, guitar, producer, vocals
 Mike Will Made It –   producer
 Greg Morgan – engineer
 Tiffany Morriar – choir/chorus
 Oresa Napper-Williams – choir/chorus
 Melodie Nicholson – choir/chorus
 Barnell Norman – choir/chorus
 Serge Normant – hair stylist
 Grace Oh – violin
 Keith Parry – assistant
 Ilani Patterson – choir/chorus
 Happy Perez – guitar, co-producer
 Bob Peterson – violin
 Jackie Phillips – choir/chorus
 Chris Plata – engineer
 Kaila Potts – viola
 Herb Powers, Jr. – mastering
 Andy Proctor – package production
 Q-Tip – keyboards,   producer
 Rey Reel – co-producer
 Daniela Rivera – assistant
 Dave Rowland – assistant
 Zane Shoemake – assistant
 Chris Sholar – guitar
 Kathleen Sloan – violin
 Katrina Spence – choir/chorus
 Malik Spence – choir/chorus
 Steve Stoute – vocals
 Rob Suchecki – assistant
 Brian Sumner – engineer
 Jess Sutcliffe – engineer
 Shari Sutcliffe – contracting, production coordination
 Jenny Takamatsu – violin
 Phil Tan – mixing
 Kaylana Tatum – background vocals
 Mary Ann Tatum – vocal arrangement, vocal producer, background vocals
 Julio Whitaker – background vocals
 Eric Turner – choir/chorus
 Ina Veli – violin
 Josefina Vergara – violin
 Wale – featured artist,
 Andre Washington – choir/chorus
 Matt Weber – assistant
 Karla Welch – stylist
 Blair Wells – engineer
 Andy West – design
 Thomas Whiteside – photography
 Mike Whitson – viola
 Stevie Wonder – harmonica, soloist
 Eric Wong – marketing
 James "Big Jim" Wright – producer
 Kristen Yiengst – artwork, photo production
 Kenta Yonesaka – assistant, engineer
 Gabriel Zardes – assistant

Charts

Weekly charts

Year-end charts

Release history

See also 
 List of Billboard number-one R&B/Hip-Hop albums of 2014

References 

2014 albums
Def Jam Recordings albums
Mariah Carey albums
Albums produced by Rodney Jerkins
Albums produced by Hit-Boy
Albums produced by Mike Will Made It
Albums produced by Jermaine Dupri
Albums produced by Q-Tip (musician)
Albums produced by The-Dream
Albums produced by Tricky Stewart